Hebeloma candidipes is a species of mushroom in the family Hymenogastraceae.

candidipes
Fungi of Europe